Simo Matavulj (14 September 1852 – 20 February 1908) was a Serbian writer. 

He was a representative of lyric realism, especially in short prose. As a writer, he is best known for employing his skill in holding up to ridicule the peculiar foibles of the Dalmatian folk.

He was an honorary member of the Matica srpska of Novi Sad, the first president of the Association of Writers of Serbia, president of the Society of Artists of Serbia and a member of the Serbian Royal Academy.

Legacy
Nobel prize winner Ivo Andrić called him "the master storyteller".

Works

Noć uoči Ivanje, Zadar, 1873.
Naši prosjaci, Zadar, 1881.
Iz Crne Gore i Primorja I, Novi Sad, 1888.
Iz Crne Gore i Primorja II, Cetinje, 1889.
Novo oružje, Belgrade, 1890.
Iz prіmorskog žіvota, Zagreb, 1890.
Sa Jadrana, Belgrade, 1891.
Iz beogradskog života, Belgrade, 1891.
Bakonja fra-Brne, Belgrade, 1892.
Uskok, Belgrade, 1893.
Iz raznijeh krajeva, Mostar, 1893.
Boka i Bokelji, Novi Sad, 1893.
Primorska obličja, Novi Sad, 1899.
Deset godina u Mavritaniji, Belgrade, 1899.
Tri pripovetke, Mostar, 1899.
Na pragu drugog života, Sremski Karlovci, 1899.
S mora i planine, Novi Sad, 1901.
Beogradske priče, Belgrade, 1902.
Pošljednji vitezovi i Svrzimantija, Mostar, 1903.
Život, Belgrade 1904.
Na slavi, Belgrade, 1904.
Zavjet, Belgrade, 1904.
Car Duklijan, Mostar, 1906.
Nemirne duše, Belgrade, 1908.
Bilješke jednoga pisca, Belgrade, 1923.
Golub Dobrašinović

Translations
Na vodi by Guy de Maupassant, 1893.
Vilina knjiga, a collection of fairy tales, 1894.
Bleak House by Charles Dickens 1893.
Zimske priče by M. de Vogie, 1894.
The dream by Émile Zola
Pučanin kao vlastelin by Moliere, 1906.
The Misanthrope by Moliere,
The Imitation of Christ by Thomas à Kempis, unpublished during Matavulj's lifetime

References

 Translated and adapted from Jovan Skerlić's Istorija nove srpske književnosti / History of New Serbian Literature (Belgrade, 1921), pp. 390–395.

External links

  Extensive biography

1852 births
1908 deaths
People from Šibenik
People from the Kingdom of Dalmatia
Serbs of Croatia
Serbian novelists
Serbian writers
19th-century novelists